Kazantsevo is a rural locality (a selo) in and the administrative center of Kazantsevsky Selsoviet, Kuryinsky District, Altai Krai, Russia. The population was 250 as of 2013. There are 6 streets.

Geography 
Kazantsevo is located 34 km south of Kurya (the district's administrative centre) by road. Rudovozovo is the nearest rural locality.

References 

Rural localities in Kuryinsky District